Omoglymmius craticulus is a species of beetle in the subfamily Rhysodidae. It was described by R.T. Bell and J.R. Bell in 1985. It is known from Moroto, southeastern New Guinea (Papua New Guinea).

Omoglymmius craticulus holotype, a female, measures  in length.

References

craticulus
Beetles of Papua New Guinea
Endemic fauna of Papua New Guinea
Insects of New Guinea
Endemic fauna of New Guinea
Beetles described in 1985